Archery at the 1993 Southeast Asian Games was held at the Gloucester Archery Range in Singapore.

References

Archery at the Southeast Asian Games
1993 Southeast Asian Games
1993 in archery
International archery competitions hosted by Singapore